Dufek Head is an ice-covered headland  northeast of Tyree Head in southern Ross Island. It was named by the Advisory Committee on Antarctic Names (2000) in association with Tyree Head, after Rear Admiral George J. Dufek, U.S. Navy, Commander of the U.S. Naval Support Force Antarctica, 1954–1959.

Dufek Coast, Dufek Massif, and Dufek Mountain are also named for Dufek.

References

Headlands of Ross Island